Wardell Fouse (July 22, 1960 – July 24, 2003), also known by his aliases Darnell Bolton and Poochie, was a Bloods gang member who was implicated in the murder of the Notorious B.I.G. As he was deceased by the time his alleged involvement was known to the police, no charges were filed against him.

Death Row Records 
Wardell Fouse was born in Kentucky and moved to Compton with his family when he was 15. At some point, he joined the Mob Pirus, a "set" (subgroup) of the Bloods street gang and acquired the nickname "Poochie". Suge Knight, whom Poochie would become close friends with, was also affiliated with this Bloods set. Poochie was arrested several times, including one instance when Reggie Wright Jr., who would later become the head of security at Death Row Records, arrested Poochie for the possession of 1 kilogram of cocaine and an assault weapon.
Poochie worked as a bodyguard at Death Row Records and was a close friend of Suge Knight. Sometime before the murder of The Notorious B.I.G., Knight purchased an Impala for Poochie.

Danny Boy, an artist at Death Row Records, described Poochie in an interview:“He definitely was a killer. He looked like it. He acted like it when it he came in the room. It was something about him. He wasn’t a tall man. He wasn’t big, nothing like that. To me he looked like that wasn’t the one to fuck with.”

Murder of the Notorious B.I.G. and investigation

Shooting of Christopher Wallace 
At 12:30 am 9 March 1997 (PST), Christopher Wallace, known professionally as the Notorious B.I.G., was leaving an after-party hosted by Vibe Magazine and Qwest Records at the Petersen Automotive Museum. The party had been closed down by the Los Angeles Fire Department because of overcrowding. Wallace and his entourage were leaving in two SUVs, with Wallace sitting in the front seat of the first vehicle.

At 12:45 am (PST), Wallace's SUV stopped at a red light on the corner of Wilshire Boulevard and South Fairfax Avenue when a dark-colored Chevrolet Impala SS pulled up next to his vehicle. The driver of the Impala, who was described as a black man, drew a 9mm pistol and fired multiple shots at Wallace's vehicle. Wallace was hit by four bullets and was rushed to Cedars-Sinai Medical Center, where he was pronounced dead at 1:15 am (PST).

1997 Investigation by Russell Poole 
Following Wallace's death, there was much speculation that the murder was linked to the shooting of Tupac Shakur, which occurred 6 months earlier in Las Vegas. Both Wallace and Shakur were central figures in the East Coast–West Coast hip hop feud. Detective Russell Poole of the LAPD led the initial investigation of the murder. After several months of investigating, Poole suspected that Suge Knight had hired LAPD officer David Mack, as well as Mack's friend Amir Muhammad, to carry out the murder. Muhammad, who was not an official suspect at the time, came forward to clear his name. Poole sent his findings to the then-chief of the Los Angeles Police Department, Bernard C. Parks, who ordered Poole to cease all investigations of Officer David Mack. In protest of Parks' and the LAPD's handling of the case, Poole retired from the department in late 1999. As a result, the case stalled.

2006 Investigation by Greg Kading 
Eventually, the case was reopened in 2006 and was led by LAPD detective Greg Kading. His investigation concluded that Wallace was shot by Wardell "Poochie" Fouse, who Suge Knight contacted through his then-girlfriend, Theresa Swann.

After Swann confessed to being involved in the murder, the FBI sent her to meet Suge Knight in prison, while wearing a body-wire, in order to extract a confession from him. However, Knight did not say anything incriminating during the visit.

Death 
Wardell Fouse died on 24 July 2003, after being shot 10 times in his back, as he rode his motorcycle in Compton. He was reportedly killed by members of the Fruit Town Piru, another "set" of the Bloods, which the Mob Piru were feuding with. He was buried at Inglewood Park Cemetery.

Depictions in media 

 In Episode 10 of the Unsolved series, the shooting death of Fouse is depicted. He is portrayed by Harry Fowler. 
 In the movie City of Lies, he is mentioned by Commander Fasulo (Peter Greene), who tells Jack (Forest Whitaker), that Wardell Fouse was a "Mob Piru Blood who Suge Knight paid to kill Biggie". Furthermore, an image of Fouse is visible on Detective Poole's (Johnny Depp) wall when Jack enters Poole's apartment.

References 

1960 births
2003 deaths
2003 murders in the United States
Bloods